Coward Creek is a  stream originating on Atherton Peak in the southern Santa Cruz Mountains. It flows through Santa Cruz County until it joins the Pajaro River, which flows, in turn, to Monterey Bay and the Pacific Ocean.

History
Coward Creek is named for John Rawson Coward, an early landowner registered to vote in the Pajaro precinct of Santa Cruz County in 1868 and a native of Maryland.

Watershed and Course 
Coward Creek arises on the western slope of Atherton Mountain and flows westerly  through Fern Canyon, Mill Canyon, Kinky Canyon and then Cummings Canyon along the southwest corner of the Santa Cruz Mountains, then turns south to flow  to its confluence with the Pajaro River.

Ecology and Conservation 
Coward Creek is the western end of the Pajaro River Gap, a critical linkage for wildlife east–west across the southern edge of the Santa Cruz Mountains and north–south from that range to the Gabilan Range to the south. It is mostly an intermittent stream today, although it is perennial in the upper reaches. However, those upper reaches did not host steelhead trout (Oncorhynchus mykiss) in a 1983 report.

See also 
Pajaro River
Santa Cruz Mountains

References

External links
 Pajaro River Watershed Flood Prevention Authority
  Pajaro Watershed Web Portal

Rivers of Santa Cruz County, California
Santa Cruz Mountains
Rivers of the San Francisco Bay Area
Rivers of Northern California